A brasero (Spanish: "brazier") is a heater commonly used in Spain. It is placed under a table covered with a cloth that extends to the floor to provide heat for people sitting at the table. This arrangement (which is called a mesa camilla) is similar to the Japanese kotatsu or Iranian korsi. Braseros were traditionally heated with small pieces of charcoal, called cisco or picón; nowadays they are usually electric.

There are some risks attached to the traditional, charcoal-heated brasero. The embers can burn the fabric or the clothes of the users, causing a fire. Given that braseros are covered, combustion can occur with small quantities of oxygen, and instead of carbon dioxide, carbon monoxide can be generated. Carbon monoxide poisoning can kill victims in their sleep, especially in poorly ventilated rooms.

In South America, notably Argentina, a brasero is a small grill attached to a box with coals used to serve sizzling hot meats at an asado.

Cooking appliances
Furniture